Fastback is a car body style characterized by a continuous slope from the roof to the base of the deck lid.

Fastback may also refer to:

 Fastback (comics), DC Comics fictional superhero
 FastBack (software), software for backing up Macintosh and IBM PC computers
 Fiat Fastback, a subcompact coupe SUV
 IBM Tivoli Storage Manager FastBack, continuous data protection and recovery management platform
 Capella Fastback, one of the Capella XS light aircraft
 Norton Commando Fastback, the original version of the Commando line introduced from 1968